Difa (also spelled Difeh) is a village in northwestern Syria administratively part of the Muzayraa Subdistrict of the al-Haffah District, located east of Latakia. According to the Syria Central Bureau of Statistics (CBS), Difa had a population of 403 in the 2004 census. Its inhabitants are predominantly Alawites. Difa is the birthplace of well-known poet Badawi al-Jabal.

References

Bibliography

Populated places in al-Haffah District
Alawite communities in Syria